The Kingdom of Kumalarang or "古麻剌朗" in ancient Chinese texts, is a prehispanic Filipino and Yakan kingdom located on what is now the northwestern coast of Basilan island stretching until the Municipality of Kumalarang at the Zamboanga Peninsula, both places being named after Kumalarang.

Kumalarang is listed in the Ming Shilu (the imperial annals of the emperors of the Ming dynasty) among other kingdoms in Insular Southeast Asia (e.g. Malacca, Brunei, Sulu) as a polity that was conferred an imperial seal by the Ming Emperor in the mid-15th century.

References

Former countries
Former countries in Philippine history
History of Sulu
History of Mindanao
History of the Philippines (900–1565)